Nemotelus argentifer is a species of soldier fly in the family Stratiomyidae.

Distribution
Armenia, Bulgaria, Cyprus, Greece, Iran, Israel, Italy, Kazakhstan, Russia, Spain, Turkey, Ukraine, Yugoslavia.

References

Stratiomyidae
Insects described in 1846
Diptera of Europe
Diptera of Asia
Taxa named by Hermann Loew